Crawshaw may refer to:

Places 
 Crawshaw, New Zealand, a suburb in western Hamilton in New Zealand
 Crawshaw, West Yorkshire, a location in England
 Crawshaw Academy, a secondary school with academy status in Pudsey, West Yorkshire, England 
 Crawshawbooth, a village in Lancashire, England

People with the surname
 Ernest Crawshaw (1889–1918), New Zealand cricketer
 Frances Crawshaw (1876–1968), English artist
 Frank Crawshaw (1899–1984), played Arnold Tanner in Coronation Street
 John Crawshaw Raynes VC (1887–1929), an English recipient of the Victoria Cross
 Raymond "Ray" Crawshaw (1908–1975), English professional footballer
 Richard Leigh "Dick" Crawshaw (1898–1965), English professional association football player
 Richard Crawshaw (1917–1986), British Labour Party Member of Parliament
 Robert Crawshaw (1869–1952), British water polo player and swimmer 
 Thomas Brooks, 1st Baron Crawshaw (1825–1908), a British peer
 Tommy Crawshaw (1872–1960), English professional association football player
 William Crawshaw (1861–1938), New Zealand cricketer

Other
 Baron Crawshaw, a title in the Peerage of the United Kingdom